Capital Mountain is an andesitic shield volcano located in Alaska. Its elevation is 7,730 ft (2356 m).

References

External links 
 

Volcanoes of Alaska
Shield volcanoes of the United States
Pleistocene shield volcanoes
Calderas of Alaska
Pleistocene calderas